Robert Hebble, born in 1934, was an American composer, arranger, and organist. He worked as a voluntary assistant to the organist Virgil Fox. He died on February 17, 2020.

Works

Organ music

Original compositions 
 A Symphony of Light
 Haec Dies Resurgam
 Festival Fanfare (published by H.T. FitzSimons Company)
 Rejoice ! 14 Improvisations on Hymn Melodies
 Toccatino on Rico Tino (based on "Festal song")
 Near the cross (published by Lorenz Publishing Company)
 Ah, Holy Jesus
 In the cross of Christ I glory (tune Herzliebster Jesu)
 Jesus, Keep Me Near the Cross (tune Near the cross)
 My song is love unknown (tune Rhosymedre)
 What Wondrous Love Is This (tune Wondrous Love)
 When I survey the wondrous cross (tune Hamburg)
 The Crystal Cathedral Organ Collection - 12 pieces for the Hazel Wright Organ
 Celebration
 Diptych (based on "Orientis Partibus")
 Heraldings (dedicated to Dr. and Mrs. Robert Schuller)
 Meditation on "My shepherd will supply my need"
 Nave (based on "Divinum Mysterium")
 Toccata on "Old Hundredth"
 Pastel
 Prelude on "I Wonder as I Wander"
 Psalm prelude
 Schematics (based on "Ton y botel" and "Ebenezer")
 Seven palette sketches of Utrillo
I - Rue des Saints-Pères
II - Lapin agile sous la neige
III - L'église Saint-Séverin
IV - Paris, vu du Square Saint-Antoine
V - L'église Boissy-Saint-Antoine
VI - La chapelle de Beaulieu
VII - Crépuscule, Golfe du Morbihan
 Soft Stillness and the Night
 Cathedral of commerce (commissioned by the Friends of the Wanamaker Organ for the 2011 centenary of the organ in the Philadelphia department store.)

Arrangements 
 Amazing Grace
 By arrangement only
 Siciliano, from Sonata n°2 for flute, by J.S. Bach
 Lament of Dido, from Dido & Aeneas, by H. Purcell
 Dialogo per organo, from L'organo Suonarino, by A. Banchieri
 Pavane, from Ma Mère l'Oye, by M. Ravel
 Little litanies of Jesus, by G. Grouvlez
 Sospiri, by E. Elgar
 In the garden (based on the tune "Garden"), by C. Austin Miles
 Christmas, Variations on "Adeste fidelis", by G. Dethier
 Northern lights, by S. Karg-Elert
 Vergin, tutto amor, by F. Durante
 Liebestod, from Tristan & Isolde, by R. Wagner
 Prayer, from Sea Shell, by C. Engel
 Prelude to Act III, from Tristan & Isolde, by R. Wagner
 Hear the angels sing, artistic carol settings for organ
 We Three Kings Of Orient Are
 Silent Night, Holy Night
 O Jesu Sweet, O Jesu Mild
 Away In A Manger
 Joseph Dearest, Joseph Mine
 Of the Father's Love Begotten
 It Came Upon the Midnight Clear
 O Little Town of Bethlehem
 Ted Alan Worth in concert
 Symphonia No 29, by Johann Sebastian Bach
 Romanza, by Edvard Grieg
 Winter Night, by Frederick Delius
 Homage to Fritz Kreisler (based on "Londonderry Air")

Anthems

Hymns 
 Hymnal Companion For Organ (free accompaniments and modulations with original hymns in organ score)
 For the Masses (published by Sacred Music Press)
 Sing of Mary
 Hail, Holy Queen, Enthroned Above (Salve Regina Coelitum)
 At the cross her station keeping (Stabat Mater Dolorosa)
 Hail, Holy Queen, enthroned above (Salve Regina Coelitum)
 Come, Holy Ghost, Creator Blest
 Favorite Hymns for Organ (published by Alfred Music)
 Abide with Me
 Fairest Lord Jesus
 Joyful, Joyful We Adore Thee

References

1934 births
2020 deaths
Composers for pipe organ
American male organists
American male composers
21st-century American composers
21st-century organists
21st-century American male musicians
21st-century American keyboardists
American organists